Cimaterol (INN) is a beta-adrenergic agonist.

See also
Dichloroisoprenaline

References

Phenylethanolamines
Sympathomimetic amines
Benzonitriles
Anilines